The Dewoitine D.26 was a military trainer developed in Switzerland for the Swiss Air Force in parallel with the D.27 fighter.

Design and development
The D.26 airframe was similar to that of the D.27. Differences included:
The engine cowling was omitted on the D.26;
The D.26 radial engine was smaller and produced 340 hp power;

Operational history
10 examples were built by Dewoitine for assembly by the Swiss factory K+W Thun in Switzerland. These were followed by an order for two more aircraft equipped with a slightly higher-powered version of the Wright 9Q engine that powered the initial batch, and one of the original D.26s was similarly re-engined. The original D.26s were used principally for training in gunnery and formation flying, while the more powerful aircraft were used for air-to-air combat training. To this end, they were equipped with gun cameras.

The D.26 enjoyed a long service life, not being withdrawn until 1948. At this time, they were transferred to the Aero-Club der Schweiz where they were used as glider tugs. The last example was not retired from aeroclub use until 1970, whereupon it was preserved at the military aviation museum at Dübendorf.

Only 2 planes are still airworthy in original condition. Number 286 is based in Grenchen LSZG and number 284 is based in Lausanne LSGL. Both planes tour in airshows as "Patrouille Dewoitine - Swiss Air Force 1931".

Operators

Swiss Air Force

Specifications

References

 
 

1920s French military trainer aircraft
D.026
Parasol-wing aircraft
Single-engined tractor aircraft
Glider tugs
Aircraft first flown in 1929